The 2018 Jiangsu Suning season is Jiangsu Suning's 10th season in the Chinese Super League and 21st overall in the Chinese top flight. They also competed in the Chinese FA Cup.

Season events
Finished 12th in 2017 Chinese Super League, Jiangsu Suning start their 10th consecutive season in the Chinese top flight, also qualified for Chinese FA Cup and start competition from forth round. On 25 July 2018, after 2–3 lost on aggregate to Guangzhou R&F, they are eliminated from the cup event.

Current squad

First team

Reserves

Out on loan

Transfers

In

Out

Friendlies

Spain training sessions

Dubai training sessions

Italy training sessions

 Selection of Serie D clubs from Tuscany.

2018 Clubs Super Cup

Competitions

Chinese Super League

League table

Results by round

Results summary

Matches

Chinese FA Cup

Squad statistics

Goal scorers

Disciplinary Record

Notes

References

External links
Official Website 

Jiangsu F.C. seasons
Jiangsu Suning F.C.